The 2022 Tour de Langkawi (known as the Petronas Le Tour de Langkawi for sponsorship reasons) was a road cycling stage race that took place from 11 to 18 October 2022 in Malaysia. The race is a category 2.Pro-rated event as part of the 2022 UCI ProSeries, and is the 26th edition of the Tour de Langkawi. The race returned after a one-year hiatus, due to the COVID-19 pandemic in Malaysia, and is making its second appearance in the UCI ProSeries.

In late January, race organisers postponed the Tour de Langkawi, originally scheduled for 3–10 March, to 11–18 June, due to a surge in COVID-19 pandemic cases. It was postponed again, to mid-October, due to time conflicts with other cycling championships.

Teams 
Six of the 18 UCI WorldTeams, four UCI ProTeams, seven UCI Continental teams, and three national teams make up the 20 teams that are participating in the race. Each team can enter a roster of up to six riders.

Defending champion Team Sapura Cycling were barred from competing in the event due to making a late payment to the UCI's enhanced anti-doping programme.

UCI WorldTeams

 
 
 
 
 
 

UCI ProTeams

 
 
 
 

UCI Continental Teams

 
 
 
 
 
 
 

National Teams

 Malaysia
 Philippines
 Thailand

Route

Stages

Stage 1 
11 October 2022 — Kuala Pilah to Kuala Lumpur,

Stage 2 
12 October 2022 — Kuala Klawang to Raub,

Stage 3 
13 October 2022 — Putrajaya to Genting Highlands,

Stage 4 
14 October 2022 — Sabak Bernam to Meru Raya,

Stage 5 
15 October 2022 — Kuala Kangsar to Kulim,

Stage 6 
16 October 2022 — Georgetown to Alor Setar,

Stage 7 
17 October 2022 — Kuah to Gunung Raya,

Stage 8 
18 October 2022 — Kuah to Kuah,

Classification leadership table

Current classification standings

General classification

Points classification

Mountains classification

Asian rider classification

Team classification

References

External links 
 

2022
Tour de Langkawi
Tour de Langkawi
Tour de Langkawi